"Царевна" (Tsaryevna) is the third single from Belarusian singer Dmitry Koldun. Koldun has recently seen great successes with previous songs Work Your Magic and Я Для Тебя in his homeland Belarus and in neighbouring Russia.

The media in these countries has highly publicised the new song with countless interviews with Koldun and picture releases showing Koldun behind the scenes. The song is expected to achieve a high chart position following Koldun's past success. Unlike Я Для Тебя this song is new and has not been performed by Koldun before (like in the Fabrika contest/s).

On 27 April 2008 the music video could be viewed on YouTube. The video was made available early for Koldun fans on his official forum.

References

External links
  

Dmitry Koldun songs
2008 singles
2008 songs
Song articles with missing songwriters